Spiss is a municipality in the district of Landeck in the Austrian state of Tyrol located 22 km south of the city of Landeck at the border of Switzerland. It is one of the smallest communities in the district. Formerly a part of Nauders, it became its own municipality in 1547. The main sources of income nowadays are tourism and agriculture.

References

Cities and towns in Landeck District